For 1978 in television, see:
1978 in American television
1978 in Australian television
1978 in Austrian television
1978 in Belgian television
1978 in Brazilian television
1978 in British television
1978 in Canadian television
1978 in Chinese television
1978 in Croatian television
1978 in Danish television
1978 in Dutch television
1978 in French television
1978 in Irish television
1978 in Italian television
1978 in Japanese television
1978 in New Zealand television
1978 in Scottish television
1978 in Singapore television
1978 in South African television
1978 in South Korean television
1978 in Thai television